There are two noteworthy triple decker apartment houses built by Erick Kaller in Worcester, Massachusetts.  They are located in Worcester's east side Belmont Avenue neighborhood, on the west side of Eastern Avenue north of Belmont Avenue.  Both were built about 1894 in the Queen Anne style, and were originally nearly identical.  They are wood-frame buildings, covered by hip roofs, and having a conventional side hall plan with a projecting side jog.  The front facades are asymmetrical, with projecting polygonal bay windows on the left side, and a single-story porch sheltering the entrance on the right.  The principal difference between the two is that 148 Eastern has flared siding skirts below its projecting bay windows, while 146 has plain siding there. Both have lost some of their styling due to subsequent exterior alterations, including the application of modern siding. (see photos)

The houses were part of a series built on Eastern Avenue about 1894, a period of rapid growth in the area.  Most of the residents were Scandinavian immigrants, employed in wire and steel factories on the city's north side.  Erick Kaller was a worker in a local wire factory, and lived at #146.  The Kaller family retained ownership of both buildings through the 1920s.  They were listed separately on the National Register of Historic Places in 1990.

See also
National Register of Historic Places listings in eastern Worcester, Massachusetts

References

Apartment buildings in Worcester, Massachusetts
Apartment buildings on the National Register of Historic Places in Massachusetts
Queen Anne architecture in Massachusetts
Houses completed in 1894
National Register of Historic Places in Worcester, Massachusetts
1894 establishments in Massachusetts